Henry Phoenix  (1856–?) was a Welsh international footballer. He was part of the Wales national football team, playing 1 match on 25  March 1882 against Scotland .

At club level, he played for Wrexham in the 1880s.

See also
 List of Wales international footballers (alphabetical)

References

1856 births
Welsh footballers
Wales international footballers
Wrexham A.F.C. players
Place of birth missing
Year of death missing
Association football midfielders